The A980 road is a relatively short  main road in north-east Scotland.

The A980 connects the A944 road with the trunk A93 road.

Route 
North to South
A944 between Alford, Aberdeenshire and Bridge of Alford
Muir of Fowlis
Craigievar Castle
Crossroads
Lumphanan
Torphins
Milltown of Campfield
Banchory, junction with the A93

References

External links 

Its entry in SABRE
Article in GEOGRAPH

Roads in Scotland
Transport in Aberdeenshire